The Board of Open Schooling and Skill Education (BOSSE), is the board of open schooling recognized by the Government of Sikkim in India. BOSSE is established under the act of the Board of Open Schooling and Skill Education; Sikkim Act 2020 was passed on 21 September 2020 by the Sikkim Legislative Assembly stated under Act No. 14 of 2020. The state government of Sikkim has created a mechanism through BOSSE to provide for secondary education, senior secondary as well as skill and vocational education up to pre-degree level and to provide opportunity to continue education to such students who have missed the opportunity of school education. The BOSSE is a state open school board that administers examinations for secondary and senior secondary examinations similar to the NIOS, CBSE and the CISCE. BOSSE offers a unique platform where students may choose skill and vocational subjects along with their secondary and senior secondary papers. The board is mandated to promote open schooling and to undertake research, innovation and development activities in the area of open schooling to strengthen the open and distance education system.

Events

 The Board of Open Schooling and Skill Education organized a national conference on "NEP 2020: Towards India-Centred Holistic Inclusive Quality School Education" on its first foundation day held at Sikkim.
BOSSE received a letter of appreciation from Shri M. Venkaiah Naidu, Vice President of India.
Dr. Subhas Sarkar, MoS Education, Govt. of India, Chief Guest, inaugurated the event.
Sh. Kunga Nima Lepcha, Education Minister of Sikkim, addressed the conference.

Conference
The Board of Open Schooling and Skill Education (BOSSE), Sikkim, along with Global Rainbow Foundation (GRF), jointly organized a one-day international conference, "Educating, Enabling, and Empowering Divyangjan (Differently Abled Persons with Special Needs): Issues and Challenges" at UNESCO Delhi on 20 August 2022. 
The conference was inaugurated by the chief guest, Sh. G. P Upadhyay, Additional Chief Secretary, Government of Sikkim; 
Mr. Eric Falt, Director, and Representative, UNESCO, New Delhi; conference chairperson
Professor Armoogum Parsuramen, founder and chairperson of GRF and former Education Minister of Mauritius
Chief patron of the conference, Shri Hemant Goel, while Dr Kuldeep Agrawal, vice chairperson of BOSSE, was the conference co-chairperson and convenor.
 FICCI has been a part of the "School Education Conference 2022
BOSSE in association with FICCI has been a part of the "School Education Conference 2022" held on the 9th & 10th of December,2022 at Delhi to promote the "STUDENT FIRST" initiative.

BW Leadership Summit 2023 on 18th January 2023.
It’s an immense pleasure to share that Dr. Kuldeep Agarwal, Vice Chairperson, BOSSE, Sikkim is one of the eminent and acclaimed speakers, shared his insights & ideas on the topic- 'Education Starts Early: Progress, Challenges and Opportunities' at BW Leadership Summit 2023 that was held on 18th January 2023.

Awards
The Board of Open Schooling and Skill Education has been awarded Most Promising Open School Board in India at the Education Leadership Summit 2021 organized by ArdorComm Media Group held on 30 September 2021.

BOSSE (Board Of Open Schooling &Skill Education) splendid performance in the education sector has bagged the title of Best Innovative Open School Board in India’ at the Asian Education Awards 2022′, held in Bangkok, Thailand on 12th November 2022. BOSSE is well recognized in the international arena for its comprehensive course curriculum with excellent learning tools, the best faculties, and academicians from all spheres of technology and humanities. Board of Open Schooling &Skill Education-BOSSE is the most promising institute for open school learning format. BOSSE is focused to lead the education industry from the forefront and to contribute in holistic and pre-degree school education for the youths of India.

Recognition-And-Approvals

BOSSE has been established under the Act No. 14 of 2020 by Govt. of Sikkim. – Click Here
AIU has granted equivalency status to BOSSE and recognised BOSSE’s certificates for further studies. Click Here
NIOS has included BOSSE in the list . – Click Here
Equivalence to /Recognition Of BOSSE - (COBSE ) Council of Boards of School Education in India - Click Here
Pharmacy Council of India (PCI) has considered BOSSE for admission to various pharmacy courses. - Click Here
Indian Nursing Council (INC) has considered BOSSE for admission to various Nursing courses. - Click Here
An ISO 9001 : 2015 Certified Board
Equivalence to /Recognition Of BOSSE - Assam Higher Secondary Education Council - Click Here
Equivalence to /Recognition Of BOSSE - Goa Board Of Secondary and Higher Secondary Education - Click Here
Equivalence to /Recognition Of BOSSE - Maharashtra State Board of Secondary & Higher Secondary education - Click Here
Equivalence to /Recognition Of BOSSE - Board Of Secondary Education, Odisha - Click Here
Equivalence to / Recognition Of BOSSE - Mangalayatan University - Aligarh - Click Here
Recognition to BOSSE Grant Of ECNR (Emigration Check Not Required) Passports
Equivalence to /Recognition Of BOSSE - Central University Of kashmir - Click Here
Equivalence to /Recognition Of BOSSE - MP Bhoj Open University - Click Here
Equivalence/recognition letter to BOSSE from Tezpur Central University
BOSSE Received Letter of Appreciation from Shri M. Venkaiah Naidu, Vice President of India. Click Here
Felicitation Message to BOSSE from Om Birla (Speaker of the Lok Sabha, India) for imparting illustrious skill-based education. Click Here
Shri Kalraj Mishra (Governor of Rajasthan) Appreciation Message To BOSSE. Click Here
Biswabhusan Harichandan’s (Governor of Andhra Pradesh) Compliments to BOSSE For Constructive Employment-Oriented and Academic Curriculum.. Click Here
Lt Gen Gurmit Singh’s (Governor of Uttarakhand) Appreciation Message To BOSSE. Click Here
Message to BOSSE From – Shri. Ramesh Pokhriyal ‘Nishank’ , Ex. Minister of Education, Govt. of India – Click Here
Message to BOSSE From – Shri. G. P. Upadhyaya, IAS , Additional Chief Secretary , Education Department Government of Sikkim –
Click Here

Courses offered
BOSSE offer the following courses which includes the following three levels:

Secondary level
Senior secondary level
 Skill and vocation education

Salient features
Transfer of credit up to two subjects
Dual/part-time admission
On-demand examinations
Public examination twice a year
Combination of vocational subjects with academics

Examinations
BOSSE conducts its examinations twice a year in April–May and October–November on dates fixed by the board. However, candidate may also choose transfer of credit/on-demand examination at the time of admission at the secondary and senior secondary level. Results of the public examinations are announced usually six weeks after the last date of examinations.

References

School qualifications of India
Distance education in India
School boards in India
High school course levels
Ministry of Education (India)